is a Japanese pétanque athlete from Aoyama Pétanque Tokyo. She won a bronze medal in the women's singles  event at the 2016 Asian Beach Games held in Danang, Vietnam and was the only Japanese medalist in pétanque at the games.

References

Living people
Pétanque players
Year of birth missing (living people)